Northwest Arkansas Democrat-Gazette is a daily newspaper in Fayetteville, Arkansas owned by Northwest Arkansas Newspapers and has circulation of 17,807 copies.

History
The Northwest Arkansas Times was formerly owned by the Thomson Corporation, who sold it to Hollinger in 1995; Hollinger sold it on to Community Publishers Inc., owned by Jim Walton, in 1999. In 2005, WEHCO Media bought the Northwest Arkansas Times and the Benton County Daily Record from CPI. In 2009, WEHCO and Stephens Media merged their northwest Arkansas papers into a joint venture, Northwest Arkansas Newspapers.

On Jan. 5, 2015, Northwest Arkansas Newspapers consolidated their four daily newspapers -- The Northwest Arkansas Times, Benton County Record, Springdale Morning News, and Rogers Morning News—with the Northwest Arkansas edition of the Democrat-Gazette, creating the Northwest Arkansas Democrat-Gazette, with the former separate local papers serving as the local news section inside the newspaper.

History
The Democrat was founded on June 14, 1860, and operated under that name until 1893. The paper was then renamed to the Fayetteville Daily Democrat. In 1911, it was purchased by Jay Fulbright and upon his death in 1923 passed to his wife, Roberta Fulbright. She became president and publisher, renaming the paper to the Northwest Arkansas Times in 1937. Upon Fulbright's death in 1953, control of the paper passed to her son-in-law, Hal Douglas.

References

External links
 
 

Daily newspapers published in the United States
Bentonville, Arkansas
Fayetteville, Arkansas
Rogers, Arkansas
Springdale, Arkansas
Newspapers published in Arkansas